Retidrillia is a genus of sea snails, marine gastropod mollusks in the family Borsoniidae.

Species
Species within the genus Retidrillia include:
 Retidrillia megalacme (Sykes, 1906)
 Retidrillia pruina (Watson, 1881)
 Retidrillia willetti (Dall, 1919)

References

 McLean J. H. (2000). Four new genera for northeastern Pacific gastropods. The Nautilus. 114: 99-102. page(s): 100

External links
  Bouchet P., Kantor Yu.I., Sysoev A. & Puillandre N. (2011) A new operational classification of the Conoidea. Journal of Molluscan Studies 77: 273-308
 

 
Gastropod genera